The Toronto Sculpture Garden is located at 115 King Street East in a small 80 by 100-foot (25 by 30 m) park directly across the street from Cathedral Church of St. James (Toronto), in Toronto, Ontario, Canada. It operated as an independent entity from 1981 to 2014 and is administered by the city's parks department.

Amenities

The main amenity in the Sculpture Garden is a waterfall fountain along the East wall. The width of the fountain waterfall is equal to the width of the grille, i.e. .

Exhibits
Toronto Sculpture Garden exhibits temporary works of art by various sculptors, and commissions works up to a maximum budget of $30,000. Exhibiting artists have included: Brian Groombridge (1990), Kim Adams (1994), Liz Magor (1997), and Derek Sullivan (artist) (2005).

References

External links
 City of Toronto parks

Art museums and galleries in Ontario
Museums in Toronto
Art galleries established in 1981
1981 establishments in Ontario
Sculpture gardens, trails and parks in Canada
Public art in Toronto